Tanja Kylliäinen (born 30 January 1993) is a Finnish swimmer. She competed in the women's 400 metre individual medley event at the 2016 Summer Olympics. Kylliäinen was born in Baltimore, Maryland to an American mother and a Finnish father. She has lived her whole life in the United States and speaks only a few words of Finnish.

References

External links
 

1993 births
Living people
Finnish female medley swimmers
Olympic swimmers of Finland
Swimmers at the 2016 Summer Olympics
Sportspeople from Baltimore
American people of Finnish descent
Finnish people of American descent